The Oregon Rangers was the first organized militia of the white settlers located in the Willamette Valley in the contested region of the Oregon Country, later the U.S. state of Oregon. First established in 1844, the force was never called out to service by the Provisional Government of Oregon and was soon dissolved. Later a second militia was formed in 1846 with the same name, which lasted only a few months. An early historian of Oregon, Frances Fuller Victor, gave a negative assessment of the two forces, stating there lacked "any deeds of prowess performed by the rangers..."

Cockstock Incident
The Cockstock Incident involved a Wasco named Cockstock was employed on black Winslow Anderson's farm in 1843, with a horse promised as payment. Prior to the end of his work however, the horse was sold to another black pioneer, James D. Saules. This angered Cockstock, who took the horse and issued threats to both settlers. Arriving at Oregon City on 4 March 1844, Cockstock and five Wascos walked around the settlement, showing off their rifles for several hours before crossing the Willamette River. The party returned later that day with an interpreter to ask the settlers why they were "pursuing him with hostile intentions" when a crowd rushed on them, some pioneers wanting to "shoot him at any risk".

During the skirmish three men died, two being pioneers, with George LeBreton, Recorder of the legislature, killed by Cockstock with a poisoned knife. Cockstock himself was killed by having his skull broken by the barrel of Anderson's rifle. This conflict was part of the motivation for the bill by the Provisional Government excluding blacks from Oregon. The Oregon Rangers were called upon by the Executive Committee "to bring to justice all the Indians engaged in the affair." Due to efforts of Elijah White however, peace with the Wascos was maintained after the payment of "two blankets, a dress, and [a] handkerchief" to Cockstock's widow.

The Oregon Rangers was organised on 23 March 1844, in response to the outbreak of violence, with orders to meet at the Oregon Institute. A total of 25 men enlisted in the group including Webley John Hauxhurst, Lindsay Applegate, William Henry Gray, and Daniel Waldo. They were at first led by Captain Thomas D. Keizur, who resigned shortly afterward, with Charles H. Bennett taking command. These men were expected to provide their own weapons, and promised $2 daily for active service. Despite being "aimed as much at the Hudson's Bay Company as at the Indians", the company in its first iteration never entered combat and was eventually disestablished.

Battle Creek Incident
The organization was revived in May 1846 at Daniel Waldo's farm in the Waldo Hills.  Many of the 45 men who drew up an agreement to create a mounted rifle company were a part of the previous outfit. The agreement read in part:
"That we, as citizens of said territory, in pursuance of this duty, forthwith organize ourselves into a company of  mounted riflemen, and pledge ourselves to abide by such rules, regulations and laws as may be adopted by a majority of the company."
"Resolved, That this company shall be called "The Oregon Rangers.""
With the creation, they selected the officers of the company as follows: Captain Charles Bennett, First Lieutenant A.A. Robinson, Second Lieutenant Isaac Hutchins, Third Lieutenant Hiram English, orderly sergeant Thomas Holt, second sergeant Thomas Howell, third sergeant S.C. Morris, fourth sergeant William H. Herron, first corporal P.C. Keizer, second corporal Robert Walker, third corporal B. Frost, fourth corporal John Rowe. Many in the group had some military experience, including Bennett and Holt who had been in the Seminole War as dragoons.

In June 1846 a band of Wascos arrived in the Willamette Valley and camped on the Santiam River. The band was probably on a seasonal berry gathering excursion, a traditional movement that "almost certainly dates back hundreds of years." Rumors began to spread among the pioneer settlements accusing these Wascos of thefts, including livestock formerly owned by the Methodist Mission. An estimated forty Rangers rode about 14 miles to location occupied by the band, under the command of Robinson, near what became known as Battle Creek in Marion County, Oregon. A short skirmish ensued with one Ranger collapsing from heat exhaustion and one Wasco injured by David Daily. The Rangers soon retreated a short distance and then opened fire with their longer range rifles. A parley ensued, with the Wascos upset and angered by the unprovoked attack, and they denied the accusations of their supposed thefts. As there was no evidence to support the settlers' claims, the Rangers offered a horse and some blankets as reparations to the injured native. The poor judgment and action by the Rangers led to ridicule by fellow settlers and the company was disbanded.

References

1844 establishments in Oregon Country
Marion County, Oregon
Military in Oregon
Provisional Government of Oregon
1846 disestablishments in Oregon Country
Military units and formations established in 1844